The 2022 Idaho Senate election took place as part of the biennial 2022 United States elections. Idaho voters elected state senators in all of the state's 35 senate districts. State senators serve two-year terms in the Idaho Senate.

Retirements

Republicans
District 2: Steve Bair: Retired 
District 4: Mary Souza: Retired to run for Secretary of State
District 6: Dan G. Johnson: Retired 
District 11: Patti Anne Lodge: Retiring
District 21: Regina Bayer: Retired 
District 23: Christy Zito: Retired 
District 24: Lee Heider: Retired

Democrats
District 16: Grant Burgoyne: Retired
District 27: Michelle Stennett: Retired 
District 29: Mark Nye: Retired

Incumbents defeated in primary

Republicans
District 1: Jim Woodward was defeated by Scott Herndon.
District 5: Peter Riggs was defeated by Carl Bjerke.
District 7: Carl Crabtree was defeated by Cindy Carlson.
District 13: Jeff Agenbroad was defeated by Brian Lenney.
District 14: Steven Thayn was defeated by fellow incumbent C. Scott Grow in a redistricting race.
District 15: Fred Martin was defeated by Codi Galloway.
District 24: Jim Patrick was defeated by Glenneda Zuiderveld.

Predictions

Results summary

Close races

Summary of results by State Senate District

Detailed Results

See also
2022 Idaho elections

References

Senate
Idaho Senate
Idaho Senate elections